Victoria Ellen Bond (born 6 May 1945) is an American conductor and composer in New York City.

Early life
Victoria Bond was born in Los Angeles, California, the daughter of operatic bass and medical doctor Philip Bond (a vocalist with the New York City Opera) and concert pianist Jane Courtland, who studied with Bela Bartok. Her grandfather was Samuel Epstein, a composer, conductor and double bass player. Bond married Stephan Peskin in 1974.

Education 
Bond attended University of California, Los Angeles and University of Southern California, studying voice with William Vennard and composition with Ingolf Dahl.

She received her doctorate at the Juilliard School of Music, where she studied composition with Roger Sessions and conducting with Jean Morel and Sixten Ehrling. She took masterclasses with Herbert von Karajan. She also studied with Herbert Blomstedt at Aspen Music Festival and School. While a student at Juilliard, Bond served as assistant to Pierre Boulez, Mstislav Rostropovitch and Aaron Copland. She was the first woman to be awarded a doctoral degree in Orchestral Conducting from Juilliard in 1977.

Awards 
She is the recipient of the Victor Herbert Award, the American Academy of Arts and Letters’ Walter Hinrichsen Award, the Perry F. Kendig Award and the Miriam Gideon Prize. She has been awarded honorary doctorates from Hollins and Roanoke Colleges, and Washington and Lee University.

Conductor 
Bond was music director and conductor of Roanoke Symphony Orchestra from 1986 to 1995 and artistic director of Opera Roanoke from 1989 to 1995. In addition, she held the following conducting and artistic positions:

 Pittsburgh Symphony: Exxon/Arts Endowment Conductor (1978-1980)
 Pittsburgh Youth Symphony: music director and conductor (1978-1980)
 New Amsterdam Symphony: artistic director (1978-1980)
 Albany Symphony: guest conductor (1980-1985)
 Empire State Youth Orchestra: music director (1980-1985)
 Bel Canto Opera Company (New York): artistic director
 New York City Opera: assistant conductor (1985)
 Southwest Virginia Opera: artistic director
 Harrisburg Opera: artistic director
 Ray Charles orchestral concerts (national and international tours): conductor (1986-2003)
 Wuhan Symphony: music advisor (1994)
 Southwest Virginia Opera: music director (1997)
 Harrisburg Opera: music director (1997-2002)
 Chamber Opera Chicago: principal guest conductor (2005)

She was the first American woman to conduct and record in China with the Shanghai Symphony (1994), the Central Opera (2004) and to be appointed Music Advisor to the Wuhan Symphony (1994).

Composer and performer 
Bond began her professional performing career as a soprano, and was the featured soloist in the premiere performance and recording on Columbia Masterworks of Harry Partch’s opera Delusion of the Fury.

She has composed operas including Mrs. President about Victoria Woodhull, which premiered in 2012 in Anchorage, Alaska, and Clara about the life of Clara Schumann, which premiered in 2019 at the Berlin Philharmonic Easter Festival.

Other operas include The Adventures of Gulliver commissioned by American Opera Project through Opera America’s grant to Female Composers (2016); The Miracle of Light commissioned by The Young Peoples Chorus of New York City and premiered by Chamber Opera Chicago (2017), Sirens, commissioned by the Roger Shapiro Fund and premiered by Cygnus (2017); Travels premiered by Opera Roanoke (1995).

She assisted film composer Paul Glass and Hugo Friedhofer in orchestrating and ghost-writing film scores for Universal Pictures and Metromedia Studios.

Ms. Bond is Artistic Director of Cutting Edge Concerts New Music Festival in New York, which she founded in 1998, and is a frequent lecturer at the Metropolitan Opera Guild and has lectured for the New York Philharmonic.

Works

Selected works include:
Blue and Green Music string quartet, 2019
Binary 4-hand version, 2019
Simeron Kremate piano, 2017
Sirens opera, chorus, chamber ensemble, actors, 2017
The Adventures of Gulliver opera, 2016
Clara opera, 2015
Soul of a Nation Concerto for Violin and String Ensemble, 2015
The Reluctant Moses Oratorio; bass-baritone, double bass, orchestra, chorus SATB, 2015
The Crowded Hours Concerto for Trumpet and Wind Ensemble, 2015
Bridges Five-Movement Orchestral version , 2014
How Lovely is Your Dwelling Place Chorus, organ, 2014
The Indispensable Man Concerto for Clarinet and Wind Ensemble, 2012
The Miracle of Light Hanukkah opera, 2011
Pater Patriae Concerto for Flute and Wind Ensemble, 2011
Leopold Bloom's Homecoming tenor, piano, 2011
Br’er Rabbit and the Wolves’ Party narrator, violin, cello, banjo, 2011
There Isn’t Time Harry Partch Instruments, 2010
Instruments of Revelation" flute, clarinet, violin, cello, piano. 2011Frescoes and Ash Chamber Ensemble, 2009Coqui string quintet + woodwind quintet, 2009Binary one piano version, 2008Seduction and Sanctification, Triple Concerto for flute, viola, harp and orchestra, 2007Bridges chamber version, 2006Sacred Sisters for violin and harp, 2005Woven for violin and viola, or 2 flutes, or 2 violins, 2005My Grandfather’s Balalaika string quartet, 2003A More Perfect Union, 2002Ancient Keys concerto for piano and orchestra, 2002Mrs. President, chamber opera, 2001Jasmine Flower (茉莉花; Moli Hua) for viola solo, 1999A Modest Proposal for tenor and orchestra, 1999Potirion Sotiriu for piano, 1999Insects for solo electric viola, 1996Travels, 1994Thinking like a Mountain for Narrator and orchestra, 1994Dreams of Flying for string quartet, 1994Urban Bird, concerto for alto saxophone an orchestra, 1993Hot Air, woodwind quintet, 1991Molly ManyBloom soprano and string quartet, 1990Black Light for piano and orchestra, 1988What’s the Point of Counterpoint? for narrator and orchestra, 1985The Frog Prince for piano and orchestra, 1984Great Galloping Gottschalk for American Ballet Theater, 1981Journal for chamber orchestra, 1981Trio: Other Selves for Jacob’s Pillow Dance Festival, 1979Equinox orchestra, 1977Conversation Piece for viola and vibraphone, 1975
Duet for flute and viola, 1969Mirror, Mirror'' for soprano, flute and viola, 1969

External links
Victoria Bond's page at Theodore Presser Company
Official website of Victoria Bond

References

1945 births
Living people
20th-century classical composers
21st-century classical composers
American women classical composers
American classical composers
Musicians from Los Angeles
American opera composers
Mannes School of Music alumni
USC Thornton School of Music alumni
Juilliard School alumni
Women conductors (music)
21st-century American composers
Women opera composers
20th-century American composers
20th-century American conductors (music)
21st-century American conductors (music)
20th-century American women musicians
20th-century American musicians
21st-century American women musicians
Classical musicians from California
20th-century women composers
21st-century women composers